John F. Russo (July 11, 1933 – August 12, 2017) was an American politician and attorney from New Jersey, who served in the New Jersey Senate and was Senate President.

Early life and education 
Russo was born in Asbury Park and was a resident of Toms River. He was a 1955 graduate of the University of Notre Dame and received a law degree from Columbia Law School in 1958.

Career 
He served for nine years as an assistant prosecutor in Ocean County, and was first elected to the State Senate in 1973.

In the Senate, Russo served on the Joint Committee on Appropriations and a Special Sub-Committee on Tax Reform and was the chair of the Committee on Energy, Agriculture and Environment and the Senate Judiciary Committee. In 1982, he wrote a bill reinstating capital punishment in New Jersey. Russo served as Senate President from 1986 to 1990.

Russo ran for the Democratic Party nomination for Governor of New Jersey in 1985, placing second behind nominee Peter Shapiro, who was in turn soundly defeated by Thomas Kean in the general election.

Following his retirement from the Senate, Russo was a partner at the Princeton Public Affairs Group. In 2007, while a bill was proposed that would abolish capital punishment in the state, he sat on the Death Penalty Study Commission and testified against passage of the bill.

Death 
Russo died on August 12, 2017 of esophageal cancer at the age of 84.

References

|-

|-

1933 births
2017 deaths
Columbia Law School alumni
People from Asbury Park, New Jersey
People from Toms River, New Jersey
Presidents of the New Jersey Senate
Democratic Party New Jersey state senators
University of Notre Dame alumni
New Jersey lawyers
Deaths from cancer in New Jersey
Deaths from esophageal cancer
20th-century American lawyers